Katherine Lee Graham (born April 30, 1997), known professionally as K. Lee Graham, is an American model and beauty queen who was crowned Miss Teen USA 2014.

Early life and education
Graham was born on April 30, 1997 in Florence, South Carolina as Katherine Lee Graham to Randall and Jennifer Graham. She is the second oldest of five children. She has stated that her nickname "K" comes from her older sister, since when her sister was a baby she could not pronounce Katherine, and called her K instead.

Graham graduated from the University of South Carolina in 2019.

Pageantry
Graham competed in Miss South Carolina Teen USA 2013 and finished as the fourth runner-up. The following year, she competed in Miss South Carolina Teen USA again and was crowned Miss South Carolina Teen USA 2014. At Miss Teen USA 2014, she was crowned the winner, beating the first runner-up Miss Mississippi Teen USA Vaeda Mann.

Personal life
Graham has been a vegetarian since 2011 and enjoys theatre, singing, dancing, acting, and writing. She runs a blog dedicated to empowering women and girls called Live Beautifully and actively participates with her church's child ministry.

References

1997 births
Living people
Miss Teen USA winners
People from Chapin, South Carolina
Female models from South Carolina
University of South Carolina alumni
21st-century American women